Wani/Vani (or Wanie, Wyne, Wain) is a surname of a caste found throughout India and Pakistan, especially in Jammu and Kashmir, Punjab and Maharashtra. Both Wain (pronounced like wine with a nasal 'n') and Wani/Vani are acceptable pronunciations. 

Historians agree that the Wani/Wain belong to the merchant caste of Baniya, and were originally Kashmiri Hindus. Even among those Wani/Wain who converted from Hinduism to Islam, the profession of these people remained primarily in trade and commerce. Taareekh Hassan has mentioned that Wani Muslims became one of the highest castes among Sheikhs (Wani also use Khwaja as their prefix). 

Wains are divided into several sub-castes such as Kesar-Wani (those who sell saffron), Tal-Wain (those who sell oil), Pui-Wani, Baand-Wani, Bas-Wani, Tarangar-Wani, Kakar-Wani, and Par-Wani. Because of the adoption of different trades by members of the tribe, various branches of the tribe have come into existence. In the 1931 census about 72,311 people were identified with Wani caste. Some Wanis have migrated from the Kashmir Valley to Punjab region, as well as Uttar Pradesh, Madhya Pradesh and Bihar.

People with the surname
Ashfaq Majeed Wani (1966–1990), Separatist militant
Burhan Wani (1994–2016), Kashmiri militant
Jagannath Wani (1934–2017), Indo-Canadian statistician and philanthropist
Nazir Ahmad Wani (died 2018), Indian soldier
Mansukh Wani (died 2020), Indian-American scientist
Rangnath Wani, Indian politician and member of the Shiv Sena
Mohan R. Wani (born 1965), Indian biologist and immunologist

See also 
Vaishya Vani

References

Kashmiri-language surnames
Sanskrit-language names
Pakistani names
Surnames
Bania communities
Indian surnames
Hindu surnames
Kashmiri tribes
Kashmiri Hindus
Kashmiri Muslims
Vaishya community